The Aufseß is a river of Bavaria, Germany. It passes through the village Aufseß, and flows into the Wiesent near Waischenfeld.

See also
List of rivers of Bavaria

References

Rivers of Bavaria
Rivers of Germany